Severance package is the common use of the term 'Walking Papers'.

Walking Papers may also refer to:
 Walking Papers (band), a Seattle rock band 
 Walking Papers (album), the Seattle band's 2013 album
 Apollo Up! released an album titled Walking Papers in 2008 
 Hostage Life released an album titled Walking Papers in 2008 
 Zachary Cale released an album titled Walking Papers in 2008